Mantes may refer to
Mantes, a synonym for a genus of insects, Mantis (genus)
Mantes-la-Jolie, a commune in Yvelines, France
Mantes-la-Ville, a commune in the Yvelines, France
Mantes-en-Yvelines, a former communauté d'agglomération comprising both the above